The Group 6A North Region was a division of the Virginia High School League. Along with the 6A South Region, it consisted of the largest high schools in Virginia. The region was formed in 2013 when the VHSL adopted a six classification format and eliminated the previous three classification system. It is a successor to the AAA Northern Region.  The conference system was scrapped prior to the 2017–18 academic year, reverting the previous district. Regions were also renamed, with schools in the 6A North Region distributed into either Group 6A Regions C & D.

Districts for 2021-2022

Region D (Northern Region)

Concorde District
 Centreville High School of Clifton
 Chantilly High School of Chantilly
 James Madison High School of Vienna
 Oakton High School of Vienna
 South Lakes High School of Reston
 Westfield High School of Chantilly

Liberty District
 George Marshall of Falls Church
 Herndon High School of Herndon
 Langley High School of McLean
 McLean High School of McLean
 Wakefield High School of Arlington
 Washington-Liberty High School of Arlington
 Yorktown High School of Arlington

Region C (Occoquan Region)

Patriot District
 Fairfax High School of Fairfax
 Lake Braddock of Burke
 Robinson of Fairfax
 South County of Lorton
 Alexandria City of Alexandria
 West Potomac of Alexandria
 West Springfield of Springfield
 W.T. Woodson of Fairfax

National District
 Annandale of Annandale
 Falls Church of Falls Church
 Hayfield Secondary School of Alexandria
 Justice of Falls Church
 Mount Vernon 
 John R. Lewis of Springfield
 Edison of Alexandria
 Thomas Jefferson of Alexandria

References

External links
 VHSL-Reference 
 Virginia High School League

Virginia High School League
High school sports in Virginia